Acuity may refer to:

Biology and medicine
Visual acuity, the behavioral ability to resolve fine image detail
Tactile acuity, resolving fine spatial details with the sense of touch
 Acute Catheterization and Urgent Intervention Triage Strategy (ACUITY)

Businesses
Acuity Advisors Limited, a British tech financing company
Acuity Brands, an American lighting and building management firm
Acuity Insurance, an American insurer
Acuity Solutions, an American manufacturing consultancy

Ships
 (or Tedship), a British tanker coaster